The 2012 Montreal Alouettes season was their 46th season for the team in the Canadian Football League and their 58th overall. The Alouettes finished in 1st place in the East Division with an 11–7 record. However, the Alouettes lost the East Final to the Toronto Argonauts 27–20. The Alouettes opened their training camp at Bishop's University in Sherbrooke, Quebec on June 3.

Offseason

CFL draft
The 2012 CFL Draft took place on May 3, 2012 live at 3:00 PM EDT. The Alouettes had six selections in the six-round draft, after trading their first-round pick to the BC Lions for Sean Whyte and trading Dylan Steenbergen for another sixth-round pick.

Preseason 

 Games played with white uniforms.

Regular season

Season standings

Season schedule 

 Games played with colour uniforms.
 Games played with white uniforms.

Team

Roster

Coaching staff

Playoffs

Schedule

 Games played with colour uniforms.

East Final
This game would be the last one played at Olympic Stadium by the Alouettes.

References

Montreal Alouettes seasons
Mont